Dramane Nikièma (born 17 October 1988) is a Burkinabé professional footballer who plays as a midfielder for Horoya AC and the Burkina Faso national team.

References

1988 births
Living people
People from Bobo-Dioulasso
Burkinabé footballers
Association football midfielders
Burkina Faso international footballers
2021 Africa Cup of Nations players
Étoile Filante de Ouagadougou players
US des Forces Armées players
Santos FC Ouagadougou footballers
Horoya AC players
Burkinabé expatriate footballers
Expatriate footballers in Benin
Burkinabé expatriate sportspeople in Benin
Expatriate footballers in Guinea
Burkinabé expatriate sportspeople in Guinea
21st-century Burkinabé people